The Mangan Inheritance, published in 1979, is a novel by Northern Irish-Canadian writer Brian Moore. Set in Ireland, it tells the story of a failed poet and cuckolded husband, James Mangan, who discovers a daguerrotype of a bohemian Romantic Irish poet with the same surname and seeks out connections to his literary ancestor.

The blurb on the back of the New York Review Books edition described The Mangan Inheritance as "melodrama at its most inventive and suggestive, an inquiry into the problem of identity and the nature of ancestry that beguiles the reader with dark deeds, wild humor, and weird goings-on, on its way towards a shocking and terrifying—and utterly satisfying—conclusion".

New York magazine described it as a "wonderful union of clarity and inventiveness".

Patricia Craig, in her biography of Brian Moore, says that The Mangan Inheritance is "among other things, a satire on the impulse to track down one's ancestors, on romantic Ireland, and on poetic pretensions".

References 

1979 British novels
1979 Canadian novels
Farrar, Straus and Giroux books
Jonathan Cape books
McClelland & Stewart books
New Canadian Library
Novels by Brian Moore (novelist)
Novels set in Ireland